Boucicaut is a station on line 8 of the Paris Métro in the 15th arrondissement.

The station was opened on 27 July 1937 as part of the extension of line 8 from La Motte-Picquet - Grenelle to Balard.  The station is named after Aristide Boucicaut, who opened Le Bon Marché, sometimes considered the world's first department store. His second wife assisted Louis Pasteur and founded the Boucicaut Hospital near the station.

Station layout

Gallery

References
Roland, Gérard (2003). Stations de métro. D’Abbesses à Wagram. Éditions Bonneton.

Paris Métro stations in the 15th arrondissement of Paris
Railway stations in France opened in 1937